Ye Lay (born Ye Htun Min; on 11 January 1984) is a Burmese hip hop singer-songwriter, musician, actor and model. He is one of the stars of the Burmese entertainment industry.

In 2011, he was the subject of a hoax that claimed he had been stabbed in a fight. He published a 212-page autobiography entitled Mad...Sea on 25 March 2012.

In May 2013, he married Aye Mya Aung, the daughter of Burmese minister Aung Min.

Discography

Solo albums
Kya Taw Nhint That Sine Thaw (2002)
Maein  (2007)
Third Kar Yan (The Third Rhyme) (2010)
Ya Kauk Bawa Phit Nay Htaing Chin (2013)
Nauk Ta Kauk (Once More) (2015)
Eain (House) 
Aung Myin Mhu Kha Yee Sin
First Live Concert
Selection

TV show
He was involved as a Judge in Myanmar Idol season 1 (2015-2016).
Shwe Moe Ngwe Moe Thoon Phyo Lo Ywar (2016)

Notes

References

External links

1984 births
Living people
21st-century Burmese male singers
People from Yangon
Burmese rappers
Burmese singer-songwriters
21st-century Burmese male actors